Legend of Destruction is an Israeli animated historical drama film, directed by director Gidi Dar, who wrote the screenplay in collaboration with Shuli Rand (based on an idea by Dr. Etan Bloom) Talmudic stories of the destruction of Jerusalem and the Second Temple.

Actors Shuli Rand, Ze'ev Revach, Amos Tamam, Moni Moshonov, Yael Abukasis and Yigal Naor voice the lead roles in the Hebrew Version.

In 2022, a new English version was recorded in the US, with voice acting by Oscar Isaac, Elliott Gould, Evangeline Lilly, Billy Zane and Marilu Henner, amongst others.

The plot is a historical epic described through the perspective of six historical figures in Roman-controlled Judaea during the late Second Temple period, and is based on historical sources such as the Talmud and Josephus' The Jewish War, which tells the story of the Great Jewish Revolt against the Roman Empire. At the same time, Jewish society was torn apart by a bloody civil war that culminated in the destruction of Jerusalem and the Second Temple.

The film was released on 15 July 2021 in Israeli cinemas. It received 7 nominations for the Ophir Awards, and 4 wins for best editing, art direction, music and sound. The film was aired on Kan 11 on February 20, 2022.

Plot
AD 66, Jerusalem. The Romans ruled Judaea with an iron fist and the sophistication worthy of the empire. They like the rich strata of society and corrupt them as a result. Even the high priests responsible for administering the temple and its works are tainted with deep corruption. In contrast, the impoverishment and oppression of the Jewish masses incites many young people to join secret groups of religious zealots, becoming freedom fighters in the name of God. They not only despise the Roman conquerors, but also the wealthy Jews who cooperate with them in oppressing their own people. As tension builds underground, a small spark triggers a rebellion.

Ben Batikh is a young Jew living in Jerusalem who feels the tax burden in the city and the Roman rule makes life unbearable. His uncle Rabban Yohanan ben Zakkai preaches for moderation, but the nephew rebels and becomes the leader of the fanatical Sicarii.

At the start of the revolt, Ben Batikh collaborates with the warrior Shimon Bar Giora but their paths later diverge. After the fall of the Galilee to the Romans from the north, John of Gischala arrives in Jerusalem to offer help. The rebels open the gates to him, but instead of uniting, the factions fight while the priests under Joshua ben Gamla slaughter and sacrifice sheep.

At the same time, the Jewish queen Berenice of Cilicia travels to the Galilee to seduce the Roman commander Titus, in hopes of saving Jerusalem.

As the Roman war machine approaches Judea to quell the revolt, Jerusalem is torn apart by bloody civil unrest: poor zealots slaughter the aristocracy non-stop and a zealous terrorist regime rules the city. Heavy street fights are waged by rival fanatical gangs, and one battle ends with the burning of food silos in Jerusalem. A terrible famine breaks out. Gangs roam the city robbing the hungry residents of their last loaves of bread. Life in Jerusalem is a total hell.

Only after the Romans surround the city, the Jewish fanatics finally unite against their common enemy. Their seemingly impossible situation transcends them to a deep spiritual state in which they lose all fear of death. They attack the Romans with daring suicide attacks. For a moment the Jews appear to gain the upper hand, but the Romans soon recover, break down the city’s walls, slaughter thousands and destroy the Temple.

Cast English Version 

 Oscar Isaac - Ben Batich
 Elliott Gould - Rabban Yohanan ben Zakkai
 Evangeline Lilly - Queen Berenice
 Billy Zane - Simon bar Giora
 Marilu Henner - Mother of Ben Batich and sister of Rabban Yohanan ben Zakkai

Cast Hebrew Version
Shuli Rand - Ben Batich
Ze'ev Revach - The High Priest Joshua ben Gamla
Moni Moshonov - Rabban Yohanan ben Zakkai
Amos Tamam - Simon bar Giora
Yigal Naor - John of Gischala
Yael Abukasis - Queen Berenice
Rita Shukron - Mother of Ben Batich and sister of Rabban Yohanan ben Zakkai
Uria Khaik - General Titus (future Roman emperor)

Production
The film was produced by Lama Films and Eddie King Films, with the assistance of the Yehoshua Rabinovich Foundation for the Arts – Cinema Project; Yaki Donitz Productions; The Jerusalem Film and Television Project; Gesher Multicultural Film Fund; Avi Chai; the Maimonides Fund; Channels HOT8 and Kan 11 under the Israeli Broadcasting Corporation; Israel Lottery Council for Culture & Arts; and the Cultural Administration and the Israeli Film Council belonging to the Israeli Ministry of Culture and Sport.

The drawing process
The film is not produced using traditional animation techniques, but by editing about 1,500 still paintings illustrated by David Polonsky and Michael Faust.

About eight years were spent developing and producing the film, including three and a half years of concept development, initial sketches and storyboarding, followed by four and a half years of producing the illustrations. Polonsky and Faust reviewed books, visited the Temple Institute in Jerusalem, and used the model of Jerusalem from the Israel Museum to accurately depict Jewish life during this period.

The paintings ranged in style from a detailed realism reminiscent of Neoclassicism to a more free-form expressionist aesthetic. Some of the illustrations were influences by famous 20th century paintings, some were inspired by well-known people from real life, while others were based on photos that the artists posed for themselves.

Contrary to current Halakhic laws, the illustrators depicted Jewish men and women without kippot and other head coverings. They explained that the decision was informed by aesthetic and plot preferences as well as their own secularism, plus the lack of official sources from that era. Nevertheless, they did not present Queen Berenice in revealing clothing, out of respect for the national religious communities.

See also

 Second Temple
 Siege of Jerusalem (70 CE)

References

External links
Official links
 
 
 Legend of Destruction at Jerusalem Film Fund website
Reviews
ד"ר מיכאל בן ארי: 'אגדת חורבן' סרט מתועב, כל מטרתו לפגוע בעם ישראל // Dr. Michael Ben Ari: "'Legend of Destruction' is an abominable movie with aim to harm the Israeli people"m, inn.co.il
"Legend of Destruction": A beating work, no less, ynet

2021 animated films
Animated drama films
2020s political drama films
2021 war drama films
2021 films
2021 drama films
2020s Hebrew-language films
Judaism-related controversies
Film controversies
Obscenity controversies in film
Obscenity controversies in animation
Religious controversies in animation
Religious controversies in film
Religious epic films
Films about Jews and Judaism
Films set in Jerusalem
Israel in the Roman era
Fiction set in ancient Rome
Epic films
Israeli animated films
Israeli war drama films